Nacoleia albiflavalis is a moth in the family Crambidae. It was described by George Hampson in 1903. It is found in Sri Lanka and Indonesia (Sulawesi and Sumbawa).

References

Moths described in 1903
Nacoleia
Moths of Sri Lanka
Moths of Indonesia